Manurewa railway station is a station serving the suburb of Manurewa in Auckland, New Zealand. It is located on the Southern Line of the Auckland railway network. The station has a side platform layout connected by a pedestrian bridge.

The station has a large park-and-ride facility and interchange with many local bus services. It is located between the SouthMall Shopping Centre and the Manurewa Work and Income office.

History
Manurewa's first station, opened in 1875, had a center-platform layout and was located behind what is now the Russell Road Reserve. From the north it was accessible from a connection to the Jutland Road bridge. To the south it featured a pedestrian overbridge, accessible from the pedestrian path between James Road and Station Road. On the other side of the overbridge was the railway lane, providing road access to the station from Station Road. After realignment of the tracks prior to electrification, very little of the original platform remains.

It was replaced by a station further south (to the north of Station Road). This station had a side-platform layout, connected by the footpath on the adjacent Station Road bridge. Closed after the current station became operational, it was removed in 2011 when the Station Road bridge was rebuilt. 

The current station was opened in July 2006 on a site even further south, behind the SouthMall Shopping Centre. It has a side platform layout connected by a pedestrian bridge. The Manurewa Bus Station was built next to the station, providing interconnection with Auckland's bus network.

By January 2014, wires had been installed as part of the Auckland railway electrification project. Since July 2015, all commuter services have been electric, using AM class electric trains.

Services
Auckland One Rail, on behalf of Auckland Transport, operates suburban services to Britomart, Papakura and Pukekohe via Manurewa. The typical weekday off-peak timetable is:
3 tph to Britomart, via Penrose and Newmarket
3 tph to Papakura

Manurewa is served by bus routes 33, 361, 362, 363, 365 and 366.

See also 
 List of Auckland railway stations
 Public transport in Auckland

References 

Rail transport in Auckland
Railway stations in New Zealand